The 5-Series class is a class of fast attack craft built by the Myanmar Navy between 1996 and 2012. There are twenty ships in this class and the designs and armaments of the ships are different based on their batches and ship types. Ships of the 5-series class are divided into FAC (Missile)s and FAC (Gun)s.

History
The first batch with five FAC(Gun)s (551,552,553,554 and 555) entered service in 1996. The second batch with three FAC(Missile)s (556,557 and 558) were commissioned in 2004. 

The third batch with two FAC(Gun)s (559 and 560) were commissioned in 2005. The fourth batch with two FAC(Missile)s (561 and 562) were commissioned in 2008 and the last batch with seven FAC(Gun)s (563,564,565,566,567,568,569 and 570) were commissioned between 2012 and 2013.

Design
In 2013, Myanmar Navy also started the modernization of 5-series class fast attack crafts with more advanced weapons, such as fitting the FAC(Gun)s with Igla(SA-24) turrets and substituting the main guns of FAC(Missile)s with NG-18 30mm close-in weapon systems.

Ships of the class

See also
 
 
 
 
 
 
 49m Stealth Fast Attack Craft
 UMS Moattama

References

Ships of the Myanmar Navy
Ship classes built by Myanmar Navy